The orange-thighed frog (Ranoidea xanthomera) is a species of tree frog native to a small area of tropical northern Queensland, Australia. It is a green frog with distinctly orange eyes, and is very similar in appearance to the red-eyed tree frog.

Description

It is a slender frog, with a thin body, flat head, and large eyes, which are orange in colour. It has a green dorsal surface, with bright yellow feet and vocal sac, and a yellow band down its flank. The inner surfaces of its legs are yellow, and the outer surfaces are green. It is distinguished, physically, from the red-eyed tree frog by the presence of bright-orange thighs; the red-eyed tree frog has mauve thighs.

Ecology and behaviour
Male orange-thighed frogs congregate around still ponds, and call from low branches, or the edges of the water. The call is a long "aaa-rk", followed by a soft trill. They call after heavy monsoon rains. The males call in a large chorus; amplexus occurs where the frog calls, and the male and female move to the laying site. The eggs are brown, and are in masses of 800 to 1600. The tadpoles are identical in appearance to those of the red-eyed tree frog.
 
The orange-thighed frog inhabits dense rainforest.

References

Ranoidea (genus)
Amphibians of Queensland
Amphibians described in 1986
Frogs of Australia
Taxobox binomials not recognized by IUCN